Roger Pyjon (fl. 1388) was an English Member of Parliament.

He was the son of William Pyjon of Shaftesbury and nephew of John Pyjon. There is a recorded mention of 'Roger Pyjon, jr.', who may have been his son.

He was a Member (MP) of the Parliament of England for Shaftesbury in September 1388.

References

14th-century births
Year of death missing
English MPs September 1388
People from Shaftesbury